Charlet Duboc is an award-winning British documentary filmmaker and on-screen host currently based in the US.

Early life 
Duboc was born in Surrey, United Kingdom, where she lived until the age of 17 when she moved to London to pursue a BA in American Studies with Film at King's College London.
Being captivated by VICE magazine as a teenager, she said in a 2013 interview: "I'd even travel all the way to London to get a copy of the magazine. I'd take it home, hide it from my mum..."

Career 
Duboc started at VICE Media in London as an editorial intern. During that time, she pitched the idea for documentary series 'Fashion Week Internationale'. which she hosted until 2016. Craving a change, she re-made the show as 'States of Undress' for American audiences of Vice's new TV channel, stepping behind the camera and casting Hailey Gates as host. Duboc went on to create further content in the US, across Vice's digital news and TV platforms as well as premium streaming networks such as HBO, Hulu and Showtime. She has appeared on CNN, MSNBC, Last Week Tonight with John Oliver and written for the Guardian and the Independent.

References

1984 births
Living people
Alumni of King's College London
Vice Media
English female models
People from Surrey
English women journalists